Remco te Brake (born 29 November 1988) is a Dutch former professional cyclist, who competed between 2010 and 2017 for the ,  and  squads. Te Brake now works as a directeur sportif for UCI Continental team .

Major results

2010
 5th Omloop van het Waasland
 5th Omloop der Kempen
 8th Ster van Zwolle
 10th Ronde van Overijssel
 10th La Côte Picarde
2011
 2nd Antwerpse Havenpijl
 3rd Ronde van Noord-Holland
 4th Kernen Omloop Echt-Susteren
 5th Arno Wallaard Memorial
 5th Omloop van het Waasland
 7th Schaal Sels
 8th Dutch Food Valley Classic
 8th Handzame Classic
 10th Tour de Rijke
2012
 5th Overall Ronde van Overijssel
 5th Ster van Zwolle
 6th Trofeo Palma de Mallorca
 8th Dwars door Drenthe
 10th Ronde van Drenthe
2013
 2nd Skive–Løbet
 3rd Ronde van Noord-Holland
 4th Overall Tour du Loir-et-Cher
 8th De Kustpijl
 9th Beverbeek Classic
2014
 1st  Overall Tour de Gironde
1st Stage 3
 3rd Kernen Omloop Echt-Susteren
 4th De Kustpijl
 8th Nationale Sluitingsprijs
 10th Ronde van Drenthe
2015
 4th Ster van Zwolle
 5th Nationale Sluitingsprijs
 8th Ronde van Overijssel
 9th Nokere Koerse
2016
 5th Dorpenomloop Rucphen

References

External links

1988 births
Living people
Dutch male cyclists
People from Rhenen
Cyclists from Utrecht (province)